A mataqali (pronounced ) is a Fijian clan or landowning unit.

See also
Culture of Fiji
Fijian traditions and ceremonies

Notes

Fijian culture